John Morley Harris, FMedSci, FRSA, FRSB (born 21 August 1945), is a British bioethicist and philosopher. He is the Lord Alliance Professor of Bioethics and Director of the Institute for Science, Ethics and Innovation at the University of Manchester.

Education
Harris was educated at the University of Kent gaining a Bachelor of Arts degree in 1966 and Balliol College, Oxford where he was awarded a Doctor of Philosophy degree in 1976 from the Faculty of Literae Humaniores.

Career
Harris was one of the Founder Directors of the International Association of Bioethics and is a founder member of the Board of the journal Bioethics and a member of the editorial board of the Cambridge Quarterly of Healthcare Ethics. He is also the joint Editor-in-Chief of the Journal of Medical Ethics. Throughout his career, he has defended broadly libertarian-consequentialist approaches to issues in bioethics.

Awards

 Fellow of the United Kingdom Academy of Medical Sciences (FMedSci) in 2001, the first philosopher to have been elected to Fellowship of the then new National Academy
 Fellow of The Royal Society of Arts in 2006
 Member of the Romanian Academy of Medical Sciences, 1994
 Medal of the University of Helsinki, 1995
 Honorary Member of The International Forum for Biophilosophy, 2001
 Fellow of The Hastings Centre, 2004
 D.Litt. (honoris causa), University of Kent, 2010

References

External links

 University of Manchester profile
 John Harris at The Guardian

Living people
1945 births
Bioethicists
British philosophers
Academics of the University of Manchester
Alumni of the University of Kent
Alumni of Balliol College, Oxford
Fellows of the Academy of Medical Sciences (United Kingdom)
British libertarians
Consequentialists
Fellows of the Royal Society of Biology